Church End may refer to one of several hamlets in Essex, England:

Church End, Chelmsford, in the parish of Great and Little Leighs
Church End, Great Dunmow
Church End, Broxted
Church End, Shalford
Church End, Ashdon

See also 
Churchend, Foulness Island